The Kings Theatre, formerly Loew's Kings Theatre, is a live performance venue in the Flatbush neighborhood of Brooklyn, New York City.  Opened by Loew's Theatres as a movie palace in 1929 and closed in 1977, the theater sat empty for decades until a complete renovation was initiated in 2010. The theater reopened to the public on January 23, 2015 as a performing arts venue. It was listed on the National Register of Historic Places on August 22, 2012.

History
Loew's Kings Theatre was designed by the architectural firm of Rapp and Rapp. The interior decor was designed by Harold W. Rambusch, with influences from the Palace of Versailles and Paris Opera House. It was built and operated by the Loew's Theatres chain, and was one of the five "Loew's Wonder Theatres" in the New York metropolitan area.  This 3,676 seat house originally presented shows that combined movies and live vaudeville.  It opened September 7, 1929, with a program that included the film Evangeline, a live stage show, orchestra and solo pipe organ. The film's star, Dolores del Río made a special live appearance. With the decline of vaudeville, however, the theater soon converted to showing feature films only.

On August 30, 1977, the Loew's Kings closed. Its final film was Bruce Lee: The Man, The Myth. After the time of its closing, when its lavish 1929 interior was almost completely intact, the shuttered theater slowly deteriorated. Extensive physical damage was sustained to the Kings's interior as a result of decades of neglect, water damage and vandalism. The roof was belatedly repaired in 1991, and again in 2007 to halt further deterioration. It has been owned by the City of New York since 1979. After closing, the theater was subject of a film documentary, Memoirs of a Movie Palace.

Renovation
After having been the object of numerous proposals for its restoration over the previous thirty years, the Kings Theatre underwent a complete renovation. The City of New York announced the plan on February 2, 2010, with a goal of returning the theatre to use as a performing arts venue. The $93 million renovation was completed in partnership with a private developer, ACE Theatrical Group of Houston, which had previously overseen major restorations of a number of historic theaters including the Boston Opera House.

The new managers, ACE Theatrical Group, spent $95 million on the renovation, including over $75,000 just on the restoration of the lobby furniture, which had been saved for four decades by the theater's old manager.

The theater's interior spaces were restored to their 1929 appearance, and its stage facilities completely rebuilt to modern standards. Restoration work in the auditorium and lobby was underway and nearing completion through late 2014. Diana Ross was the featured artist for the gala reopening performance on February 3, 2015.

Organ
When the Loew's Kings Theatre opened it was equipped with a Robert Morton theatre pipe organ. The instrument contained 23 ranks of pipes played on an elaborately decorated four manual console, one of Robert Morton's "Wonder Morton" designs, installed in all the Loew's Wonder Theatres. The organ was popular with audiences and was featured in performances between film showings. The organ remained in good condition and was played one last time in 1974 prior to its being removed and donated by the Loew's company to New York City's Town Hall. The instrument was never reinstalled however, and most of its pipes and works disappeared while in storage. In 1998, the lavish console was rebuilt for use with a comparable pipe organ in a private home in Wheaton, Illinois.

The Van der Molen family sent a "Deed of Gift" for their now 4/26 Wonder Morton to the New York Theatre Organ Society (NYTOS) on July 13, 2011.  In 2013 the organ was removed from the family's home and placed in storage for an anticipated return to the restored Kings Theatre. The renovation project budget however did not provide for transport and re-installation of the organ, estimated to cost $650,000. An engineering evaluation determined that the already installed mechanical renovations took up room in the former organ lofts that the pipes would need. It was decided that an electronic organ, played through the theatre's original console, would offer the most feasible solution.  In December 2014 ACE agreed to assist in the development of an electronic reproduction of the Wonder Morton.  The donated pipe work would be sold or donated to a suitable venue.

References
Notes

External links

Page for Loew's Kings Theatre at the Cinema Treasures website
NYC Economic Development Corp - Loews Kings Theatre Restoration Project
New York Times - Restoration of Loew’s Kings Theater Slideshow
Brooklyn Eagle - Loew's Kings To Be Transformed Into ‘Wonder Theater’ Once Again
2011 Photos of Kings Theater
Memoirs of a Movie Palace (1980 documentary) from archive.org

1929 establishments in New York City
Cinemas and movie theaters in New York City
Movie palaces
Theatres in Brooklyn
Theatres completed in 1929
Loew's Theatres buildings and structures
Buildings and structures on the National Register of Historic Places in New York City
National Register of Historic Places in Brooklyn
Theatres on the National Register of Historic Places in New York City
Flatbush, Brooklyn